The Acre gubernatorial election was held on October 3, 2010, to elect the next governor of Acre.  The PT's Tião Viana narrowly won the election and barely avoided a runoff.

Election results

References

2010 Brazilian gubernatorial elections
October 2010 events in South America
2010